There are numerous cultural references to chickens in myth, folklore and religion, language, and literature.

In Classical Antiquity 

In Greek mythology, Alectryon was a young man that Ares put as a guardian outside his door to inform him if anybody came near while he was making love to Aphrodite, who was married to Hephaestus, Ares' brother. But Alectryon fell asleep while on guard, so Helios, the sun, saw the two lovers and alerted Hephaestus. In anger over Alectryon's incompetence, Ares turned him into a rooster, a bird that always crows at dawn when the sun is about to rise, still loyal to their promise to Ares. The rooster was thus one of Helios' sacred animals.

In ancient Greece, chickens were not normally used for sacrifices, perhaps because they were still considered an exotic animal. Because of its valor, the cock is found as an attribute of Ares, Heracles, and Athena. The alleged last words of Socrates as he died from hemlock poisoning, as recounted by Plato, were "Crito, I owe a cock to Asclepius; will you remember to pay the debt?", signifying that death was a cure for the illness of life.

The term "Persian bird" for the rooster appears to have been given by the Greeks after Persian contact "because of his great importance and his religious use among the Persians".

The Greeks believed that even lions were afraid of roosters. Several of Aesop's Fables reference this belief.
The poet Cratinus (mid-5th century BC, according to the later Greek author Athenaeus) calls the chicken "the Persian alarm". In Aristophanes's comedy The Birds (414 BC) a chicken is called "the Median bird", which points to an introduction from the East. Pictures of chickens are found on Greek red figure and black-figure pottery.

In ancient Greece, chickens were still rare and were a rather prestigious food for symposia. Delos seems to have been a center of chicken breeding (Columella, De Re Rustica 8.3.4). "About 3200 BC chickens were common in Sindh. After the attacks of Aria people these fowls spread from Sindh to Balakh and Iran. During attacks and wars between Iranian and  Greeks the chickens of Hellanic breed came in Iran and about 1000 BC Hellanic chickens came into Sindh through Medan".

The mythological basilisk or cockatrice is depicted as a reptile-like creature with the upper body of a rooster. Abraxas, a figure in Gnosticism, is portrayed in a similar fashion as well.

The Romans used chickens for oracles, both when flying ("ex avibus", Augury) and when feeding ("auspicium ex tripudiis", Alectryomancy). The hen ("gallina") gave a favourable omen ("auspicium ratum"), when appearing from the left (Cic., de Div. ii.26), like the crow and the owl.

For the oracle "ex tripudiis" according to Cicero (Cic. de Div. ii.34), any bird could be used in auspice, and shows at one point that any bird could perform the tripudium but normally only chickens ("pulli") were consulted. The chickens were cared for by the pullarius, who opened their cage and fed them pulses or a special kind of soft cake when an augury was needed. If the chickens stayed in their cage, made noises ("occinerent"), beat their wings or flew away, the omen was bad; if they ate greedily, the omen was good.

In 249 BC, the Roman general Publius Claudius Pulcher had his "sacred chickens" " thrown overboard when they refused to feed before the battle of Drepana, saying "If they won't eat, perhaps they will drink." He promptly lost the battle against the Carthaginians and 93 Roman ships were sunk. Back in Rome, he was tried for impiety and heavily fined.

In 162 BC, the Lex Faunia forbade fattening hens on grain which was a measure enacted to reduce the demand for grain.  To get around this, the Romans castrated roosters (capon), which resulted in a doubling of size despite the law that was passed in Rome that forbade the consumption of fattened chickens. It was renewed a number of times, but does not seem to have been successful. Fattening chickens with bread soaked in milk was thought to give especially delicious results. The Roman gourmet Apicius offers 17 recipes for chicken, mainly boiled chicken with a sauce. All parts of the animal are used: the recipes include the stomach, liver, testicles and even the pygostyle (the fatty "tail" of the chicken where the tail feathers attach).

The Roman author Columella gives advice on chicken breeding in the eighth book of his treatise, De Re Rustica (On Agriculture). He identified Tanagrian, Rhodic, Chalkidic and Median (commonly misidentified as Melian) breeds, which have an impressive appearance, a quarrelsome nature and were used for cockfighting by the Greeks (De Re Rustica 8.3.4). For farming, native (Roman) chickens are to be preferred, or a cross between native hens and Greek cocks (De Re Rustica 8.2.13). Dwarf chickens are nice to watch because of their size but have no other advantages.

According to Columella (De Re Rustica 8.2.7), the ideal flock consists of 200 birds, which can be supervised by one person if someone is watching for stray animals. White chickens should be avoided as they are not very fertile and are easily caught by eagles or goshawks. One cock should be kept for five hens. In the case of Rhodian and Median cocks that are very heavy and therefore not much inclined to sex, only three hens are kept per cock. The hens of heavy fowls are not much inclined to brood; therefore their eggs are best hatched by normal hens. A hen can hatch no more than 15-23 eggs, depending on the time of year, and supervise no more than 30 hatchlings. Eggs that are long and pointed give more male hatchlings, rounded eggs mainly female hatchlings (De Re Rustica 8.5.11).

Columella also states that chicken coops should face southeast and lie adjacent to the kitchen, as smoke is beneficial for the animals and "poultry never thrive so well as in warmth and smoke" (De Re Rustica 8.3.1). Coops should consist of three rooms and possess a hearth. Dry dust or ash should be provided for dust-baths.

According to Columella (De Re Rustica 8.4.1), chickens should be fed on barley groats, small chick-peas, millet and wheat bran, if they are cheap. Wheat itself should be avoided as it is harmful to the birds. Boiled ryegrass (Lolium sp.) and the leaves and seeds of alfalfa (Medicago sativa L.) can be used as well. Grape marc can be used, but only when the hens stop laying eggs, that is, about the middle of November; otherwise eggs are small and few. When feeding grape marc, it should be supplemented with some bran. Hens start to lay eggs after the winter solstice, in warm places around the first of January, in colder areas in the middle of February. Parboiled barley increases their fertility; this should be mixed with alfalfa leaves and seeds, or vetches or millet if alfalfa is not at hand. Free-ranging chickens should receive two cups of barley daily.

Columella advises farmers to slaughter hens that are older than three years, those that aren't productive or are poor care-takers of their eggs, and particularly those that eat their own and other hens' eggs.

According to Aldrovandi, capons were produced by burning "the hind part of the bowels, or loins or spurs" with a hot iron. The wound was treated with potter's chalk.

In religion and mythology 

Since antiquity chickens have been, and still are, a sacred animal in some cultures, deeply embedded within belief systems and religious worship.

In the New Testament, Jesus prophesied the betrayal by Peter: "Jesus answered, 'I tell you, Peter, before the rooster crows today, you will deny three times that you know me.'" It happened, and Peter cried bitterly.

Earlier, Jesus compares himself to a mother hen when talking about Jerusalem: "O Jerusalem, Jerusalem, you who kill the prophets and stone those sent to you, how often I have longed to gather your children together, as a hen gathers her chicks under her wings, but you were not willing."

In the sixth century, Pope Gregory I declared the rooster the emblem of Christianity and another Papal enactment of the ninth century by Pope Nicholas I ordered the figure of the rooster to be placed on every church steeple.

In many Central European folk tales, the devil is believed to flee at the first crowing of a rooster.

The Talmud speaks of learning "courtesy toward one's mate" from the rooster. This might refer to the fact that when a rooster finds something good to eat, he calls his hens to eat first.  A rooster might also come to the aid of a hen if she is attacked. The Talmud likewise provides us with the statement "Had the Torah not been given to us, we would have learned modesty from cats, honest toil from ants, chastity from doves and gallantry from cocks", which may be further understood as to that of the gallantry of cocks being taken in the context of a religious instilling vessel of "a girt one of the loins" (Young's Literal Translation) that which is "stately in his stride" and "move with stately bearing" in the Book of Proverbs 30:29-31 as referenced by Michael V. Fox in his Proverbs 10-31 where Saʻadiah ben Yosef Gaon (Saadia Gaon) identifies the definitive trait of "A cock girded about the loins" in Proverbs 30:31 (Douay–Rheims Bible) as "the honesty of their behavior and their success", identifying a spiritual purpose of a religious vessel within that religious instilling schema of purpose and use.

Cocks and cockerels 

Since antiquity, the rooster has been, and still is, a sacred animal in some cultures and deeply embedded within various religious belief systems and religious worship. The term "Persian bird" for the cock would appear to have been given by the Greeks after Persian contact "because of his great importance and his religious use among the Persians", but even long before that time, in Iran, during the Kianian Period, from about 2000 BC to about 700 BC, "the cock was the most sacred".

Animism, shamanism and tribal religions
In Southeast Asia, understandings and interpretations of indigenous beliefs of the veneration of spirits and deities remain strong and for many who are practising Christians there is still the veneration of the traditional spirits (anito) as in northern Philippines. Animist beliefs extend to the rooster and the cockfight, "a popular form of fertility worship among almost all Southeast Asians" further considered by some within the Judeo-Christian ethic as a form of Baal or Baalim. Aluk or Aluk To Dolo a sect of Agama Hindu Dharma as a part of religion in Indonesia, within the Toraja society and the people of Tana Toraja, embrace religious rituals such as the funeral ceremony where a sacred cockfight is an integral part of the religious ceremony and considered sacred within that spiritual realm. 

In several myths the cock has the power to revive the dead or to make a wish come true and is well known in Torajan cosmology. Kaharingan, an animist folk religion of the Iban branch of the Dayak people, accepted as a form of Hinduism by the Indonesian government, includes the belief of a supreme deity as well as the rooster and cockfight in relation to that of the spiritual and religious and some with the belief that humans become the fighting cocks of god, with the Iban further believing the rooster and cockfight was introduced to them by god. Gawai Dayak a festival of the Dayaks includes the cockfight and the waving of a rooster over offerings while asking for guidance and blessings with the rooster being sacrificed and the blood included in spiritual offering, while the Tiwah festival involves the sacrifice of many animals including the chicken as offerings to the Supreme God. Ikenga, an alusi of the Igbo people in southeastern Nigeria requires consecration before religious use with offerings which include the sacrificial blood of a rooster or ram for the spirit.

Miao (i.e. Hmong) are animists, shamanists and ancestor worshipers with beliefs being affected in varying degrees by Taoism, Buddhism and Christianity. At the Miao New Year there may be the sacrifice of domestic animals and there may be cockfights. The Hmong of Southeast Guizhou will cover the rooster with a piece of red cloth and then hold it up to worship and sacrifice to the Heaven and the Earth. In Shamanism in the Hmong culture, a shaman may use a rooster in religious ceremony as it is said that the rooster shields the shaman from "evil" spirits by making him invisible as the evil spirits only see the rooster's spirit. In a 2010 trial of a Sheboygan Wisconsin Hmong who was charged with staging a cockfight, it was stated that the roosters were "kept for both food and religious purposes", resulting in an acquittal. In Viet Nam fighting roosters or fighting cocks are colloquially called "sacred chickens".

Santería which originated in Cuba from native Caribbean culture, Catholicism, and the Yoruba religion of West Africa "ritually sacrifices chickens". Khasi people believe the rooster is sacrificed as a substitute for man, it being thought that the cock when sacrificed "bears the sins of the man" (See also similarity of Kapport in Judaism) Yoruba oral history tells of God lowering Oduduwa down from the sky, the ancestor of all people, bringing with him a rooster, some dirt, and a palm seed. The dirt was thrown into the water and the cock scratched it to form land, and the seed grew into a tree with sixteen limbs, the original sixteen kingdoms. "The sacrifice of a cock and a ritual cockfight was part of the Imbolc festivities in honour of the pan-Celtic goddess Brighid". In the 20th century, Imbolc was resurrected as a religious festival in Neopaganism, specifically in Wicca, Neo-druidry and Celtic reconstructionism.

Astro-mythology

It is understood that the constellations of the zodiac within the belief system of astrology, "the religion of the stars", originated in the ancient land of Babylonia (including modern day Iraq). The lore of the True Shepherd of Anu (SIPA.ZI.AN.NA – Orion and his accompanying animal symbol, the Rooster, with both representing the herald of the gods, being their divinely ordained role to communicate messages of the gods. "The Heavenly Shepherd" or "True Shepherd of Anu" – Anu being the chief god of the heavenly realms. On the star map the figure of the Rooster was shown below and behind the figure of the True Shepherd, both representing the herald of the gods, in his bird and human forms respectively. Nergal, an idol of the Assyrians, Babylonians, Phoenicians, and Persians, whose name means, "a dunghill cock". (Dictionary of Phrase and Fable, Brewer, 1900) Astrological mythology of the Assyrians and Babylonians was that the idol "Nergal represents the planet Mars, which was ever the emblem of bloodshed". The Rooster is the tenth of the twelve animal symbols in the Chinese zodiac. It is suggested that the Pleiades are called the hens of Frigg or of Freya by Norse peoples. That the three stars of Orion's belt was called the Distaff of Frigg seems undoubtable -. See also Kukkuta Sastra in Divination.

Norse mythology
In Norse mythology, the crowing of three particular roosters occur at the beginning of the foretold events of Ragnarök. In the Poetic Edda poem Völuspá, references to Ragnarök begin from stanza 40 until 58, with the rest of the poem describing the aftermath. In the poem, a völva—a Nore seeress—recites information to the wisdom-seeking god Odin. In stanza 41, the völva says:

The völva then describes three roosters crowing: In stanza 42, the jötunn herdsman Eggthér sits on a mound and cheerfully plays his harp while the crimson rooster Fjalar (Old Norse "hider, deceiver") crows in the forest Gálgviðr. The golden rooster Gullinkambi crows to the Æsir in Valhalla, and the third, unnamed soot-red rooster crows in the halls of the underworld location of Hel in stanza 43. The poem Fjölsvinnsmál also mentions a rooster by the name of Víðópnir. According to the poem, the rooster sits atop the tree Mímameiðr, likely another name for the central cosmological tree Yggdrasil.

Buddhism
 Bayon Temple is an ancient Buddhist temple that also incorporates elements of Hindu cosmology includes "a depiction of a cockfight" within the walls of the temple. which continues today within a debate of "religious sanctity" With the rambling strutting roosters of the Buddhist temple of Wat Suwankhiri on a Payathonsu cliff nearby, during April, Three Pagodas Pass becomes a site of the Songkran Festival with cockfights. Sacred Buddhist amulets are made within that religious schema, created and blessed in various temples in Thailand, many depicting Buddha with cocks in fighting stance, sacred within that religion. The bird that symbolises greed in Tibetan Buddhist murals is sometimes said to be a cock.

Divination
Divination, a part of many religions is derived from the Latin divinare "to foresee, to be inspired by a god" and as a part of divination comes alectryomancy, which means rooster and divination respectively, with the intent of communication between the gods and man in which the diviner observes a cock, pecking at grain, with Judaism forbidding acts of divination in the Hebrew Bible . Alectormancy though is also sacrificing a sacred rooster, with the use of the sacred rooster through alectryomancy further understood within that religious character and likewise defined as the rooster fight or cockfight or cockfighting with the intent of communication between the gods and man. Kukkuta Sastra (Cock Astrology) is a form of divination based on the rooster fight and commonly believed in coastal districts of Andhra Pradesh, India. It is prevalent in the state, especially in the districts of Krishna, Guntur, East Godavari and West Godavari and the Sankranti festival.

Hinduism

Hindu war god Kartikeya is depicted with a rooster on his flag. A demon Surapadman was split into two and the halves turned into the peacock (his mount) and the rooster in his flag. Balinese Hinduism includes the religious belief of Tabuh Rah, a religious cockfight where a rooster is used to fight against another rooster. The altar and deity Ida Ratu Saung may be seen with a fighting cock in his hand with the spilling of blood being necessary as purification to appease the evil spirits. Ritual fights usually take place outside the temple proper and follow an ancient and complex ritual as set out in the sacred lontar manuscripts. Likewise a popular Hindu ritual form of worship of North Malabar in Kerala, India is the blood offering to the Theyyam gods. Despite being forbidden in the Vedic philosophy of sattvic Hinduism, Jainism and Buddhism, Theyyam deities are propitiated through the rooster sacrifice where the religious cockfight is a religious exercise of offering blood to the Theyyam gods. Pongal or Makar Sankranti is a Hindu harvest festival. In southern state of Tamil Nadu and western state of Gujarat, an event of the celebrations is rooster fighting also known as Seval Sandai or Kozhi kettu. It is also practised in Tulunadu. Kozhi kettu organised as part of religious events are permitted.

There are religious significance and aspects of the rooster and the cockfight which are exampled by the religious belief of Tabuh Rah, a religious and spiritual cockfight where a rooster is used in religious custom by allowing him to fight against another rooster in the Balinese Hinduism spiritual appeasement exercise of Tabuh Rah, a form of animal sacrifice, where ritual fights usually take place outside the temple and follow an ancient and complex ritual as set out in the sacred lontar manuscripts. Similarly within the religious schema of Christianity and the cockfight within a religious, spiritual and sacred context, there are numerous representations of the rooster or the cock and the cockfight as a religious vessel found in the Catacombs from the earliest period as well as similar illustrations of cocks in fighting stance taken from the Vivian Bible.

Samaritanism

The Samaritans or 'Cutheans' are an ethnic group with a long history, once widely distributed and powerful. From Assyria they extended to India, China, Arabia Petraea and Abyssinia. They were also introduced by the Assyrian Empire into Samaria, in a policy of mass deportations. They had their Samaritan Temple on Mount Gerizim, opposite the Temple in Jerusalem, and they worshipped the Mesopotamian deity Nergal: his emblem was a cock (rooster).

Judaism
The Zohar (iii. 22b, 23a, 49b), the book of Jewish mysticism and collection of writings on the Torah written by first century tannaic sage Rabbi Shimon Bar Yochai (Rashbi), tells of a celestial manifestation, which causes the crowing of the roosters; known also in the Talmud, is "blessed be He who has given the cock intelligence", (Ber. 60b). and as well as Job 38:36 in the Douay-Rheims Bible. Not only "In the rabbinic literature, the cockcrow is used as general marking of time", but also some of the Sages interpreted the "cockcrow" to mean the voice of the Temple officer who summoned all priests, Levites, and Israelites to their duties and used as such because the Hebrew gever was used also to mean a "rooster" in addition to the meaning of "man, strong man". 

The Talmud likewise provides the statement "Had the Torah not been given to us, we would have learned modesty from cats, honest toil from ants, chastity from doves and gallantry from cocks" – (Jonathan ben Nappaha. Talmud: Erubin 100b), which may be further understood as to that of the gallantry of cocks being taken in the context of a religious instilling vessel of "a girt one of the loins" (Young's Literal Translation) that which is "stately in his stride" and "move with stately bearing" within the Book of Proverbs 30:29-31. Saʻadiah ben Yosef Gaon (Saadia Gaon) identifies the definitive trait of "a cock girded about the loins" within Proverbs 30:31(Douay–Rheims Bible) as "the honesty of their behavior and their success", identifying a spiritual purpose of a religious vessel within that religious and spiritual instilling schema of purpose and use, within Judeo-Christian traditions. The Hebrew term zarzir, which literally means "girt"; "that which is girt in the loins" (BDB 267 s.v.) is recognised in the Targum as well as the Chaldaic, Syriac, Arabic, LXX and Vulgate with all referencing the fighting rooster or fighting cock as the religious vessel. 

The ancient Hebrew versions identified the Hebrew "a girt one of the loins" of Proverbs 30:31 as a rooster, "which most of the old translations and Rabbis understood to be a fighting cock", with also the Arabic sarsar or sirsir being an onomatopoeticon or onomatopoeia for rooster (alektor) as the Hebrew zarzir of Proverbs 30:31. "Rooster (Gallus domesticus) bones were identified at Lachish dating to early Iron II", but even earlier not to be ruled out, which corresponds was well with "as for Palestine, the earliest chicken bones are present in Iron Age I strata in Lachish and Tell Hasben". Further we see the rooster placed within the Star of David, known in Hebrew as the Shield of David or Magen David and recognised of Jewish identity and Judaism. In excavations at Gibeon, near Jerusalem, dating to the seventh century B.C., potsherds were found incised with cocks and "some of them placed within the six-pointed star of the Magen David". The seal of Jaazaniah carries the insignia of a rooster from the ruins of the biblical Judean kingdom at Mizpah, with the inscription of "belonging to Jaazaniah, servant to the king"., the first known representation of the chicken in Palestine, and from II Kings 25:23, we know of one Jaazaniah the Maschathit, who was an official under Gedalish at Mizpah. 

Plutarch said the inhabitants of Caria carried the emblem of the rooster on the end of their lances and relates that origin to Artaxerxes, who awarded a Carian who was said to have killed Cyrus the Younger at the battle of Cunaxa in 401 B.C "the privilege of carrying ever after a golden cock upon his spear before the first ranks of the army in all expeditions" and the Carians also wore crested helmets at the time of Herodotus, for which reason "the Persians gave the Carians the name of cocks". It is Carites in 2 Kings 11 who were used by Jehoiada to protect Joash son of Ahaziah of the line of David, ancestor to Christ from Athaliah. In the Jewish religious practice of Kapparos, a rooster as a religious vessel is swung around the head and then slaughtered on the afternoon before Yom Kippur, the Day of Atonement. The meat is the distributed among the poor for their pre-fast meal. The purpose of the ritual is the expiation of sins of the man as the animal symbolically receives all the man's sins, which is based on the reconciliation of Isaiah 1:18. The religious practice is mentioned for the first time by Natronai ben Hilai, Gaon of the Academy of Sura in Babylonia, in 853 C.E., who describes it as a custom of the Babylonian Jews and further explained by Jewish scholars in the ninth century by that since the Hebrew word geber (Gever) means both "man" and "rooster" the rooster may act or serve as a palpable substitute as a religious vessel in place of the man with the practice also having been as a custom of the Persian Jews.

Christianity

In East Timor, one of the two predominately Christian nations in southeast Asia (the Philippines being the other), for some, the roof of the house is reserved for gods and spirits of ancestors, the lower portion remains for the nature spirit and usually occupied by animals, and the cock is admired because of courage and perseverance, with the courage of a man compared with that of the cock, with the cockfight occurring regularly and "many tais designs include the cock". Reverend Dr. Kosuke Koyama's thoughts and words spreading the Christian gospel while in Indonesia of, this morning I say to myself, "I will try to bring the gospel of Christ through the medium of cockfighting!" may be further understood not only in the spiritual understandings of many in Indonesia but further in the light of numerous representations of the rooster or cock as a religious vessel found in the Catacombs from the earliest period including a painting from the Catacomb of St. Priscilla (mentioned in all the ancient liturgical sources and known as the "Queen of the Catacombs" in antiquity) reproduced in Giovanni Gaetano Bottari's folio of 1754, where the Good Shepherd is depicted as feeding the lambs, with a crowing cock on His right and left hand. 

Likewise as well within the Christian "Tomb of the Cocks" in Bayt Jibrin, which was a Palestinian Arab village located 13 miles northwest of the city of Hebron and part of the Kingdom of Israel, "we find two spirited cocks painted in red in the spandrels with a cross just over the center of the arch". Similarly a multitude of sarcophagi are found with the rooster and the sacred cockfight with the understanding of striving for resurrection and eternal life in Christianity. This sacred subject carved on early Christian tombs, where the sepulchral carvings have an important purpose, "a faithful wish for immortality, with the victory of the cock and his supporting genius analogous to the hope of resurrection, the victory of the soul over death". 

Similar illustrations of cocks in fighting stance  are found within the Vivian Bible as well as the fighting cocks capitals in the Basilica of St. Andoche in Saulieu and the Cathédrale Saint-Lazare d'Autun provides "alternate documentation" of the rooster and the religious, spiritual and sacred cockfight. All four canonical gospels state that, either during or after the Last Supper, Jesus foretold of Peter's denial (Saint Peter) and that he would deny Christ three times before the cock's crow. Augustine of Hippo, Catholic saint and pre-eminent Doctor of the Church understood "a visible sign of an invisible reality" of the rooster to include that as described by St. Augustine in DeOrdine as that which "in every motion of these animals unendowed with reason there was nothing ungraceful since, of course, another higher reason was guiding everything they did". In the sixth century, it is reputed that Pope Gregory I declared the cock the emblem of Christianity saying the rooster was "the most suitable emblem of Christianity", being "the emblem of St Peter". Some say that it was as a result of this that the cock began to be used as a weather vane on church steeples, and some a Papal enactment of the ninth century ordered the figure of the cock to be placed on every church steeple. 

It is known that Pope Leo IV had the figure of the cock placed on the Old St. Peter's Basilica or old Constantinian basilica and has served as a religious icon and reminder of Peter's denial of Christ since that time, with some churches still having the rooster on the steeple today. Alternative theories about the origin of weathercocks on church steeples are that it was an emblem of the vigilance of the clergy calling the people to prayer, that it was derived from the Goths and is only possibly a Christian symbol, and that it is an emblem of the sun. The Vatican Persian cock denoting a sacred and religious vessel acknowledged by and from the Vatican, "a girt one of the loins" of Proverbs 30:31, the Hebrew zarzir, Arabic sarsar, Greek alektor, French coq, Persian bird, Persian cock or the acknowledged rooster from the Hebrew Torah, the Christian Old Testament, the Holy Scriptures of Job, Isaiah and of the Apostles John, Luke, Matthew and Mark. 

The Gospel of Jesus Christ may still further be viewed through "A Dictionary of the Bible" which tells us that "Pindar (ca. 522–443 BC), mentions the cock, Homer (ca. 800–750 BC) names a man "gever" the word for a cock and Aristophanes (ca. 446 BC – ca. 386 BC) calls it a Persian bird." In the Bayeux Tapestry of the 1070s, originally of the Bayeux Cathedral and now exhibited at Musée de la Tapisserie de Bayeux in Bayeux, Normandy, there is a depiction of a man installing a rooster on Westminster Abbey. The cornerstone is the first stone set in the construction of a masonry foundation and over time it became a ceremonial stone with the laying of the stone being generally important metaphorically in sacred architecture. Frazer (2006: p. 106) in The Golden Bough tells us that, "In modern Greece, when the foundation of a new building is being laid, it is the custom to kill a cock, a ram, or a lamb, and to let its blood flow on the foundation-stone".

Islam
The understanding of the divine spiritual endowment of the rooster within Islam, may be evidenced in the words of Muhammad of that Abrahamic religion in one of the six canonical hadith collections of Sunni Islam, stating that of "when you hear the crowing of cocks, ask for Allah's Blessings for they have seen an angel".

Shinto
Many roosters are found around Shinto shrines, with the rooster being associated with the sun goddess Amaterasu.

Taoism

In Taoism, Hanshi and the spring Hanshi festival were when fires were not used and then relit. Since fire, like the cock a yang symbol and symbol of the sun, was temporarily extinguished and then relit. In a Tao religious aspect, to have a rooster fight another rooster, was the same in substance as a fire-renewal custom, where the rooster and the cockfight then takes its place as an indispensable spring ritual, and "Taoism, which assessed it positively in this form, can be thought to have guaranteed its continued existence". The Hanshi festival was eventually moved to coincide with the Qingming Festival or the Pure Brightness Festival which still includes the rooster and cockfight.

Zoroastrianism
Zoroastrianism, claimed to be "the oldest of the revealed world-religions" and founded by the Prophet Zoroaster (or Zarathustra) opposed animal sacrifices but held the rooster as a "symbol of light" and associated the cock with "good against evil" because of his heraldic actions. In Iran during the Kianian Period, from about 2000 B.C. to about 700 B.C., among domestic birds, "the cock was the most sacred" and within that religion, the devout, "had a cock to guard him and ward off evil spirits".

Cockfighting

In visual arts 

Visual depictions of cockfighting include Jeunes Grecs faisant battre des coqs (1846), a painting by Jean-Léon Gérôme; Vainqueur au combat de coqs (1864) a bronze statue by Alexandre Falguière; the painting Hanengevecht in Vlaanderen (1882) by Emile Claus; and some works by Robin Philipson.

In literature 

Abraham Valdelomar's 1918 tale El Caballero Carmelo depicts a cockfight between the protagonist, a cock named Carmelo, and his rival Ajiseco from a child's perspective, who considered this bird as an heroic member of his family. Nathanael West's 1939 novel The Day of the Locust includes a detailed and graphic cockfighting scene, as does the Alex Haley novel Roots: The Saga of an American Family and the miniseries based on it. In Gabriel Garcia Marquez's Nobel-Prize winning 1967 novel One Hundred Years Of Solitude, cockfighting is outlawed in the town of Macondo after the patriarch of the Buendia family murders his cockfighting rival and is haunted by the man's ghost. Cockfighting is central to García Marquez's 1965 novella No One Writes to the Colonel in which the unnamed protagonist sells all of his belongings to feed his murdered son's gamecock.  Charles Willeford wrote a novel called Cockfighter in 1962, which gives a detailed account of the protagonist's life as a 'cocker'. A description of a border town cockfight fiesta can be found in On the Border: Portraits of America's Southwestern Frontier. In Lasana M. Sekou’s 1997 novella Brotherhood of the Spurs, the title story of his James Michener Fellow collection of short stories, a cockfight in the 1960s is central to uniting the people of Saint Martin (island), partitioned by the French and Dutch in the Caribbean in 1648.

Emblems

The cockerel was already of symbolic importance in Gaul at the time of the invasion of Julius Caesar and was associated with the god Lugus. Today the Gallic rooster is an emblem of France. The rooster is also an emblem of Wallonia and the Turkish city of Denizli. Among Roman deities, Priapus was sometimes represented as a cock, with its beak as a phallus and its wattles as testicles. The cock or a man with rooster attributes was similarly used as an erotic symbol, Priapus Gallinaceus The Cockburn clan in Scotland use the cock as their badge. Their canting coat-of-arms is Argent three cocks gules, and their motto is ACCENDIT CANTU (Latin: He rouses us with song). A fighting cockerel on a ball is the symbol of Tottenham Hotspur Football Club. The cockerel wears a pair of spurs which is a reference to the club's nickname. It has been present on their crest and shield since 1901. 

Additionally, the cockerel is the emblem of Turkish sports club Denizlispor, which was founded in 1966. Also, the supporters of the club are called cockerels. Another football club that uses a rooster as its symbol is the Clube Atlético Mineiro, from Brazil. The supporters of the club and the supporters of other Brazilian clubs, often refer to Mineiro as "Galo", which means rooster in Portuguese. The "Crazy Rooster", a symbol of Clube Atlético Mineiro. In Australia, the Sydney Roosters, who play in the National Rugby League have adopted the cockerel as its emblem. The Roosters' emblem is a cock with its comb fashioned to represent the Sydney Opera House. Jesus College in the University of Cambridge features roosters on its coat of arms, which is a pun on the name of the college's founder, John Alcock. The University of South Carolina features a Gamecock, or fighting cockerel, as its mascot for all athletic programs. The Coat of arms of Kenya features a rooster holding an axe. The emblem of Chianti Classico is a black rooster. A black cockerel was believed in medieval times to be a symbol of witchcraft along with the black cat, with the rooster "used as symbols of either virtue or vice" until modern times.

A cockatrice was said to have been born from an egg laid by a rooster, as well as killed by a rooster's call.

References 

 Cultural references to
Animals in religion